Virbia immaculata, the immaculate holomelina or plain-winged holomelina, is a moth in the family Erebidae. It was described by Tryon Reakirt in 1864. It is found from the eastern coast of North America west to Manitoba. It has also been recorded in Iowa, Illinois and Indiana.

The length of the forewings is about 12 mm for males and females. The male forewings are clay, with cinnamon extending from the base to the postmedial region. The female forewings are cinnamon, extending from the base to the postmedial region. The posterior margins are fringed with salmon scales. The hindwings are peach red with a brown discal spot and subterminal markings. There are two generations per year, with adults on wing in June and again in August.

Larvae have been reared on dandelion and plantain species.

References

Moths described in 1864
immaculata